Eublemma rivula is a species of moth of the family Erebidae first described by Frederic Moore in 1882. It is found in most of southeast Asia, including Hong Kong, India, Japan, the Society Islands, Taiwan and in Australia in the Australian Capital Territory, New South Wales and Queensland.

The larvae mainly feed on Carthamus tinctorius (safflower).

References

Boletobiinae
Moths of Africa
Moths of Asia
Moths of Japan
Moths of Seychelles
Moths described in 1882